The 2004–05 NBA season was the 35th season for the Portland Trail Blazers in the National Basketball Association. During the offseason, the Blazers acquired Nick Van Exel from the Golden State Warriors and signed free agent Joel Przybilla. The Blazers played around .500 for the first two months, but started to struggle losing 11 of their 15 games in January. Head coach Maurice Cheeks was fired midway through the season with a record of 22–33. He was replaced by general manager Kevin Pritchard, who acted as interim coach for the remainder of the season, in which the team went 5–22. For the second year in a row, the Blazers did not qualify for the playoffs. The team's overall record of 27–55 was their worst since 1973–74, their fourth season of existence.

Following the season, Pritchard was fired as coach, Van Exel signed as a free agent with the San Antonio Spurs, Shareef Abdur-Rahim was traded to the New Jersey Nets, but failed his physical and later on signed with the Sacramento Kings, Damon Stoudamire signed with the Memphis Grizzlies, and Derek Anderson signed with the Houston Rockets.

For this season, they slightly once again changed their primary logo added Trail on their wordmark of the Blazers' primary logo they remained until 2017.

Draft picks

Roster

Regular season

Season standings

z - clinched division title
y - clinched division title
x - clinched playoff spot

Record vs. opponents

Game log

Player statistics

Awards and records

Transactions

References

Portland Trail Blazers seasons
Portland Trail Blazers 2004
Port
Port
Port
Portland Trail Blazers